Hassan Valley Township is a township in McLeod County, Minnesota, United States. The population was 832 at the 2000 census.

Hassan Valley was named for the nearby valley of the South Fork Crow River (formerly called the Hassan River).

Geography

Demographics
As of the census of 2000, there were 832 people, 286 households, and 237 families residing in the township.  The population density was 24.3 people per square mile (9.4/km2).  There were 298 housing units at an average density of 8.7/sq mi (3.4/km2).  The racial makeup of the township was 97.72% White, 0.12% African American, 1.08% Asian, 0.60% from other races, and 0.48% from two or more races. Hispanic or Latino of any race were 0.96% of the population.

There were 286 households, out of which 35.7% had children under the age of 18 living with them, 76.9% were married couples living together, 2.8% had a female householder with no husband present, and 17.1% were non-families. 12.2% of all households were made up of individuals, and 4.9% had someone living alone who was 65 years of age or older.  The average household size was 2.83 and the average family size was 3.11.

In the township the population was spread out, with 26.4% under the age of 18, 6.0% from 18 to 24, 28.8% from 25 to 44, 24.6% from 45 to 64, and 14.1% who were 65 years of age or older.  The median age was 39 years. For every 100 females, there were 104.4 males.  For every 100 females age 18 and over, there were 106.8 males.

The median income for a household in the township was $56,691, and the median income for a family was $59,583. Males had a median income of $36,912 versus $28,929 for females. The per capita income for the township was $19,958.  About 5.5% of families and 9.4% of the population were below the poverty line, including 8.2% of those under age 18 and 26.3% of those age 65 or over.

References

Townships in McLeod County, Minnesota
Dakota toponyms
Townships in Minnesota